The governor of Sverdlovsk Oblast is the highest official of Sverdlovsk Oblast, a region of Russia. He heads the government of Sverdlovsk Oblast and is elected by direct popular vote for the term of five years.

History of office 
On 16 October 1991, chairman of executive committee of Sverdlovsk Oblast Eduard Rossel was appointed Head of Administration of the region. Rossel pursued a policy aimed at obtaining the economic and legislative independence from the federal Center. The leadership of Sverdlovsk Oblast put forward the idea of transforming the region into an autonomous republic. President of Russia Boris Yeltsin initially announced his support for the Ural Republic, but on 9 November 1993, a presidential decree was issued on the dissolution of the Sverdlovsk Regional Council, and on the next day Eduard Rossel himself was sacked.

In 1995 election, Rossel surpassed Alexey Strakhov, and he took office as governor. He reigned for the next 14 years. In 2009, president Dmitry Medvedev appointed deputy minister of transport Alexander Misharin as the new head of the region. Three years later he was succeeded by Yevgeny Kuyvashev. In 2016 the separate office of the Chairman of the Government of Sverdlovsk Oblast was abolished.

List of officeholders

References 

Politics of Sverdlovsk Oblast
 
Sverdlovsk